The flag of Los Altos was a modification of the Central American Union, with a central seal showing a volcano (possibly Santa Maria or Almolonga) in the background with a quetzal (a local bird symbolizing liberty) in front.  Los Altos ("The Highlands" in the Spanish language) was a state in the Federal Republic of Central America in the 1830s. Its capital was Quetzaltenango and it occupied the west of present-day Guatemala and parts of the Mexican state of Chiapas. This was the first Central American flag to use the quetzal as a symbol; since 1871, it has been on the present flag of Guatemala.

See also
 Flag of Yugoslavia

References

Flag of Los Altos
National flags
Former countries in Central America